flybig is a regional airline based in Indore, Madhya Pradesh, India. It is promoted by Gurugram-based Big Charter Private Limited. The airline began operations in December 2020 and is focused on connecting tier-2 cities within India.

History
The company has received a No Objection Certificate from the Ministry of Civil Aviation and received its Air Operator's Certificate (AoC) on 14 December 2020. It began operations with a single ATR-72-500. The company's focus is to serve Tier-2 cities and it aims to build a fleet of more ATR-72s and HAL manufactured Dornier 228 aircraft and eventually expand to a fleet of 20.

Before the airline began any scheduled flights, it had won its first route under a government tender to serve Shillong from Delhi. The flights commenced on 21 December 2020 and to fulfil its obligations, the airline wet-leased a Dash 8 Q400 from SpiceJet.
The airline conducted proving flights on 4 December 2020 and operated its first scheduled flight on 3 January 2021 from Indore to Ahmedabad.

Destinations 

flybig flies to following domestic destinations, with its hub at Devi Ahilya Bai Holkar Airport in Indore

Fleet

The flybig fleet consists of the following aircraft as of February 2023:

See also
 List of airlines of India
 Transport in India

References

External links

Airlines of India
2020 establishments in Haryana
Airlines established in 2020
Indian companies established in 2020
Companies based in Haryana
Transport in Haryana